Perbadanan Putrajaya (PPj) or Putrajaya Corporation (PjC) is a local authority that administers the Federal Territory of Putrajaya and is under the Federal Territories Ministry of Malaysia. Founded in 1995, the corporation is responsible for public health and sanitation, waste removal and management, capital planning, environmental protection and building control, social and economic development, and the general maintenance functions of the urban infrastructure of Putrajaya. The main headquarters of the PPj is located at Precinct 3, Persiaran Perdana, Putrajaya. 

Putrajaya Corporation is also the operator of Nadi Putra bus services, which operates in the urban areas of Putrajaya, Cyberjaya, Kuala Lumpur and parts of the Southern Klang Valley. Putrajaya is now a metered parking area, and the corporation will issue a summons for illegal parking.

Departments
Jabatan Undang-Undang (Legal Department)
Jabatan Audit Dalam (Inner Auditing Department)
Jabatan Perkhidmatan Korporat (Corporate Services Department)
Jabatan Perkhidmatan Bandar (City Service Department)
Jabatan Kewangan (Finance Department)
Jabatan Perancangan Bandar (City Planning Department)
Jabatan Kejuruteraan dan Penyelenggaraan (Engineering and Maintenance Department)
Jabatan Lanskap dan Taman (Park and Landscaping Department)

See also
 Local government in Malaysia
 List of local governments in Malaysia

External links

 Perbadanan Putrajaya (official web site) 
 Putrajaya (City of Putrajaya website) 

Putrajaya
Putrajaya
1995 establishments in Malaysia
Ministry of Territories (Malaysia)